North Pole is a small city in the Fairbanks North Star Borough, Alaska, United States. Incorporated in 1953, it is part of the Fairbanks metropolitan statistical area. As of the 2020 census, the city had a population of 2,243, up from 2,117 in 2010. Despite its name, the city is about 1,700 miles (2,700 km) south of Earth's geographic North Pole and 125 miles (200 km) south of the Arctic Circle.

Description

The city is a summertime attraction for tourists visiting nearby Fairbanks and, due to its location on the Richardson Highway, those traveling to and from the Alaska Highway and Valdez. North Pole was home to two oil refineries, the town's major industry aside from tourism, but closed because of sulfolane contamination in groundwater. The larger refinery, operated by Flint Hills Resources, was a major source of jet fuel for Ted Stevens Anchorage International Airport. Tanker car traffic on the Alaska Railroad, entering and leaving the refinery, frequently bisects the city.

North Pole's biggest attraction is a gift shop named Santa Claus House, the modern-day incarnation of a trading post (gift shop) established in the town's early days. The Santa Claus House is known for the world's largest fiberglass statue of Santa Claus outside. A small group of domesticated reindeer are just outside.

Before Christmas each year, the USPS post office in North Pole receives hundreds of thousands of letters to Santa Claus, and thousands more from people wanting the town's postmark on their Christmas greeting cards to their families. It advertises the ZIP code 99705 as the ZIP code of Santa. A community program also responds to letters addressed to 1 Santa Claus Lane.

Christmas-themed streets in North Pole include Santa Claus Lane, St. Nicholas Drive, Snowman Lane, and Kris Kringle Drive. Street lights in the city are decorated in a candy cane motif, and many local businesses have similar decorations. The city's firetrucks and ambulances are all red, while the police cars are green and white. The city also has an all-female flat-track Roller Derby league, the North Pole Babes in Toyland (NPBT), whose athletes have Christmas and North Pole-inspired Skater names.

North Pole has some of the least expensive residential real estate in Alaska; the median home price there is $211,184.

History

The Richardson Highway south of Fairbanks led to an assortment of subdivided and unsubdivided homesteads between Ladd Field and 26 Mile Field in the 1940s and 1950s.

The area that formed the central city of North Pole was homesteaded in 1944 by Bon V. and Bernice Davis. Their son, T. Neil Davis, wrote Battling Against Success in 1997, a fictionalized account of homestead life. The Alaska Railroad established a siding on the Davis homestead as part of its branch line to Eielson Air Force Base, naming the siding Davis. This name temporarily became associated with the fledgling settlement.

In 1952, Dahl and Gaske Development Company purchased the Davis homestead, subdivided it, and renamed it North Pole, in hopes of attracting a toy manufacturer to the area. The City of North Pole was incorporated on January 15, 1953 from portions of the Davis homestead and the adjacent homestead of James Ford. Ford was named the first mayor, with Everett Dahl serving on the first city council.

Another member of that first council was Conrad B. Miller. Miller, who came to Fairbanks in 1949, opened a trading post along the highway in 1952. The business became known as the Santa Claus House, and has evolved over the years into the current roadside attraction. The business was also home to North Pole's first post office, serving in that capacity for almost 20 years. Another trading post in the community was operated by Lucius Cunningham and his family. The town's economy largely depended on these two businesses until the 1970s, when the current four-lane Richardson Highway was built, bypassing Davis Subdivision, which was effectively its downtown.

The Earth Resources refinery (now operated by Flint Hills Resources) began operations in August 1977. It is connected to the Trans-Alaska Pipeline System by several feeder pipelines operated by Golden Valley Electric Association, mostly following along the Laurence Road section line. The years after its construction saw the construction of the North Pole Plaza, a large enclosed shopping mall along the Richardson Highway. A standalone high school and increased subdivision development in previously rural areas immediately outside the city followed before the real estate market temporarily collapsed during the 1980s.

An interchange was constructed along the Richardson, where the highway intersects with the eastern end of Badger Road and the northern end of Santa Claus Lane, during the early 1990s. In the late 2000s, the northern portion of Santa Claus Lane was rebuilt to accommodate three consecutive roundabouts, serving the interchange and a nearby frontage road intersection. Another interchange was constructed on the Richardson at Dawson Road, at the far eastern edge of city limits. These improvements eliminated a number of at-grade access points to the Richardson, which had accumulated a decades-long history of serious accidents.

On April 22, 2006, police arrested several students at North Pole Middle School for allegedly plotting a school shooting, much along the lines of the Columbine High School massacre. Death in Santaland, a TV documentary about the town and the foiled school shooting plot, was made by the British journalist Jon Ronson and broadcast on the television channel More 4 in 2007.

The city government has had an often contentious history. A past mayor, Jeff Jacobson, was criticized for maintaining his full-time mayor's job while at the same time working full-time as a teacher at North Pole Middle School. In 2004, he sent a letter (and a lump of coal) to U.S. Senator John McCain about a comment he made regarding why the city's "elves" needed money for a recreation project that he considered a pork barrel project.

The current mayor of North Pole is Michael Welch. The city council consists of six members serving staggered three-year terms, with municipal elections held each October. In 2022, the city council consists of Santa Claus (2019–2022), Aino Welch (2020–2023), DeJohn Cromer (2020–2023), David Skipps (2021–2024), and Anton Keller (2021–2024).

In 2014, Americans for Prosperity quickly pulled an ad campaign in Alaska after Koch Industries closed the Flint Hills Resources Refinery in North Pole.

Geography

The city is to the north and east of the Tanana River, though access to the river is not easy due to the extensive system of levees. Beaver Springs Slough meanders through the heart of the city, emptying into Chena Slough.

North Pole is the recommended city name for all of ZIP Code 99705, which stretches between Fort Wainwright and Eielson Air Force Base, and between the Chena River and the Tanana River, including the census-designated places of Badger, which spans subdivisions connecting the eastern edge of Fairbanks and North Pole, and Moose Creek.

Climate
North Pole has a subarctic climate (Köppen Dfc). Temperatures in North Pole are heavily affected by the amount of sunlight with almost no seasonal lag effect from solar radiation. North Pole's Santa Claus House is actually closed during the week in January and February due to extreme cold in those months. Due to being landlocked and protected by mountain ranges from marine influences, North Pole, much like the rest of the Alaskan Interior, sees little seasonal lag and much greater seasonal temperature swings than areas along the coast such as Anchorage, with winters that can dip to many tens of degrees below zero Fahrenheit with average lows remaining below 0 from November 5 to March 18, and summers that see many days in the 70s, 80s, and on occasion, even 90s F.

Demographics

North Pole first appeared on the 1960 U.S. Census as a city, 7 years after it formally incorporated in 1953. The census of 1960 reported a figure of 615, but the 1970 census reported the 1960 figure as 358.

As of the 2000 United States Census, there were 1,570 people, 605 households, and 381 families residing in the city. The racial makeup of the city was 81.0% White, 5.7% Black or African American, 3.6% Native American, 2.6% Asian, 0.5% Pacific Islander, 1.2% from other races, and 5.6% from two or more races. Hispanic or Latino of any race were 3.8 % of the population.

There were 605 households, of which 38.5% had children under 18 living with them, 47.9% were married couples living together, 11.4% had a female householder with no husband present, and 26.9% were non-families. 26.9% of all households were made up of individuals, and 4.6% had someone living alone who was 65 or older. The average household size was 2.58 and the average family size was 3.19.

In the city, the population was spread out, with 29.8% under the age of 18, 13.2% from 18 to 24, 33.3% from 25 to 44, 18.5% from 45 to 64, and 5.2% who were 65 or older. The median age was 29. For every 100 females, there were 110.7 males. For every 100 females age 18 and over, there were 115.2 males.

The median income for a household in the city was $44,583, and the median income for a family was $54,583. Males had a median income of $32,917 versus $27,240 for females. The per capita income for the city was $21,426. About 6.2% of families and 8.7% of the population were below the poverty line, including 9.0% of those under 18 and 22.6% of those 65 or over.

Politics

North Pole is the most Republican-leaning area in the Fairbanks North Star Borough. In 2008 House District 11, which comprises the North Pole area, gave John McCain 7,736 votes (78.4% of the total) to Barack Obama's 1,924 (19.5%). In the 2010 gubernatorial election, Republican Sean Parnell received 5,727 votes (76.8%) to Democrat Ethan Berkowitz's 1,451 (19.5%). Republican Joe Miller received 57.3% of North Pole's vote in his failed bid against incumbent U.S. Senator Lisa Murkowski's write-in campaign.

Education
The city is in the Fairbanks North Star Borough School District. North Pole Elementary School, North Pole Middle School, and North Pole High School are within the city limits. The middle and high schools also share an attendance area with students from Midnight Sun Elementary, Ticasuk Brown Elementary, and Two Rivers Elementary.

Notable people

 Daryn Colledge (born 1982), NFL guard, was raised in North Pole and graduated from North Pole High School
 Pheonix Copley (born 1992), goaltender for the Los Angeles Kings and formerly the Washington Capitals. 
 Terry Miller (1942–1989), entered politics at age 20, serving on the first Fairbanks North Star Borough Assembly.  He eventually became president of the Alaska Senate as well as Lieutenant Governor of Alaska from 1978 to 1982 under Governor Jay Hammond
 Mike W. Miller (born 1951), brother of Terry Miller, was also involved in politics, serving for 18 years in the Alaska Legislature and also serving as Alaska's Commissioner of Administration under Governor Frank Murkowski
 Bob Ross (1942–1995), TV painter, stated numerous times during his show that he lived in North Pole for over a decade and that the scenery surrounding the town was of great inspiration for his work
 Lee Shaner (born 1981), better known by his stage name Intuition, American rapper
 Gene Therriault (born 1960), Mike Miller's successor in both the Alaska House of Representatives and the Alaska Senate, Therriault and Miller both served as president of the Alaska Senate
 Santa Claus (born Thomas Patrick O'Connor, 1947), current mayor pro tem and former congressional candidate, known for his likeness and imitation of the legendary figure

In popular culture
 In the Marvel Comics series New Avengers, the town was depicted as destroyed in "the Collective" story arc published over the course of the spring of 2006.
 The ABC reality show Extreme Makeover: Home Edition built a new house for a local family in one week in July 2006. The episode of the show was used as a premiere to the show's season, and as a kickoff point for the show's plans to rebuild a home in each state.
 In 2007, artist David Choe made North Pole, Alaska his final destination of Thumbs Up!, Season 2.
 Jon Ronson's book, Lost at Sea: The Jon Ronson Mysteries documents the author's journey through the town as he interviews residents about the April 2006 botched middle school shooting.

References

Further reading
   43 pp.
   104 pp.
   24 pp.
   141 pp.

External links

 City of North Pole
 North Pole Chamber of Commerce

Cities in Alaska
Santa Claus
Cities in Fairbanks North Star Borough, Alaska